The Reich Postal Ministry (German: Reichspostministerium, RPM) in Berlin was the Ministry in charge of the  Mail and the  Telecommunications of the German Weimar Republic from 1919 until 1933 as well as of Nazi Germany from 1933 to 1945. After the Second World War, the Federal Ministry for Post and Telecommunications in West Germany (Federal Republic of Germany) and the Ministry for Post and Telecommunications in East Germany (German Democratic Republic) took over the postal system in their respective nations.

Especially during the Nazi era, the Ministry had authority over research and development departments in the areas of television engineering, high-frequency technology, cable (wide-band) transmission, metrology, and acoustics (microphone technology).

Formation
After World War I, in February 1919, the ministry succeeded the former Reichspost agency of the German Empire that had been established in the course of the German unification in 1871. The office building of the Reich Postal Ministry was built between 1871 and 1874 in the Leipziger Straße, Berlin. Today it houses the Museum of Communications. 

The hyperinflation in the Weimar Republic created a deficit in the post- and telecommunications services. The act of 1924 (Reichspostfinanzgesetz), created the Deutsche Reichspost (DRP) as an separate entity within the RPM; financially independent, covering their expenditures with user fees, yet organizationally and personnelwise part of the national government and civil service system. Its assets received the status of a special assets, separate from the general government assets.

When the Nazis took control of the government 1933, political prerogatives became decisive, leading to the RPM with the DRP becoming an instrument for the strategic leadership of the government and the Wehrmacht. Political and military directives determined the direction of the structural and technological development of the DRP services. The principle of the DRP as a business enterprise was replaced by the Nazi tenet that the DRP was a government agency exercising important sovereign rights of the State.

During the period 1933–1935, the DRP became politically realigned and used as an instrument for the Nazi economic policy. The period 1936–1939 saw the DRP subordinate to the policy of economic self-sufficiency and preparation for war. 

In 1935, when the Territory of the Saar Basin, was incorporated into Germany, the postal and telecommunication services of the territory was integrated into the DRP. With the annexation of Austria in 1938, the Austrian postal and telegraph administration and the postal saving bureau became part of the DRP. During World War II, the DRP became an agency for warfare.

Ministers of Post, 1918–1945

Organization
During WW2 the organization of the Reichspostministerium was as follows: 
Central organization
 Minister: Dr.-Ing. Wilhelm Ohnesorge (1937-1945)
 Under-Secretary: Jakob Nagel (1937-1945)
 Administrative Council: Six members
 Bureaus:
 Bureau of foreign and colonial policy
 Central Bureau: Feldpost, Postschutz, among other matters 
 Special Bureau F1: Radio engineering construction and broadcasting technology
 Bureau I: Mail
 Bureau II: Telephone communications
 Bureau III: Telegraph- and radio communications
 Bureau IV: Personnel
 Bureau V: Budget and finances
 Bureau VI: Administration, procurement, automotive, technical
Central agencies
 Central administration of the Reichspost (see below)
 Research establishment of the Reichspost
 Central administration of the pension institution of the Reichspost
 Construction directorate of the Reichspost
Subordinate agencies
 The pension institution of the Reichspost
 Government printing office

Deutsche Reichspost

Organization
 Central administration of the Reichspost, functioning as the regional directorate for Berlin.
37 regional postal and telecommunications directorates. Each directorate came under a president who was in charge of all postal and telecommunication services within his region. A financial office was in charge of the accountancy and disbursement of moneys.

Services
The following services were provided by the Deutsche Reichspost: 
 Postal services, including mail delivery, postal checking accounts, commercial accounts, and pneumatic tube delivery in Berlin and Munich.
 Post office saving bank system
 Motor transport service, primarily for mail delivery but also for rural passenger service. It was often the only public transportation available in rural areas not served by the railways. 
 Public telegraph, telephone, cable and teletype services.
 Technical personnel and maintenance for the German Broadcasting Corporation.
 Commercial radio telegraph and telephone services with land stations, ships and aircraft.

Research activities

In 1920 the Telegraphentechnische Reichsamt department for telegraphy was established, re-arranged as the Reichspostzentralamt research centre for telegraphy, telephony and radio electronics in 1928.

On 1 January 1937, Department VIII of the former Reichspostzentralamt formed the core of the Forschungsanstalt der Deutschen Reichspost. From that date, the RPM subsumed all research and development departments in the areas of television engineering, high-frequency technology, cable (wide-band) transmission, metrology, and acoustics (microphone technology). The engineer Wilhelm Ohnesorge became the Postal Minister from February of that year.  The RPM had its own 500,000-square meter research site in Miersdorf near Zeuthen outside of Berlin.  Dr. Friedrich Wilhelm Banneitz, a television authority, was head of research.  Dr. Friedrich Vilbig, an authority on high-frequency engineering, was his deputy.

The RPM supported independent research, such as nuclear physics, high-frequency technology, isotope separation, electron microscopy, and communications technology at the private research laboratory Forschungslaboratoriums für Elektronenphysik of Manfred von Ardenne, in Berlin-Lichterfelde.  In 1940, the RPM began construction of a cyclotron for von Ardenne; it was completed in 1945.

Postschutz

Postschutz (Postal Protection) was a paramilitary unit of the DRP with a mission to protect post and telecommunication installations from armed attacks. All male postal employees could become volunteer members of the Postschutz. For all new employees from 1933, under the age of 35, it was mandatory. In 1942, the postal protection was subsumed into the Allgemeine SS; this was just one more step in the national socialization of the Deutsche Reichspost.

Air Raid Precautions
The object of the Postluftschutz (air raid precautions) was to protect the customers, personnel and installations of the DRP from the danger of air raids. The implementation of the air raid precautions rested with the Postal Protection until 1944, when the war made it mandatory for the Postal Protection to focus on its military mission.

References

Literature
 Klaus Hentschel, editor and Ann M. Hentschel, editorial assistant and Translator Physics and National Socialism: An Anthology of Primary Sources (Birkhäuser, 1996)
 Oleynikov, Pavel V. German Scientists in the Soviet Atomic Project, The Nonproliferation Review Volume 7, Number 2, 1 – 30  (2000).  The author has been a group leader at the Institute of Technical Physics of the Russian Federal Nuclear Center in Snezhinsk (Chelyabinsk-70).

Political history of Germany
Ministries disestablished in 1945
Ministries established in 1919
Postal
Science and technology in Nazi Germany
1945 disestablishments in Germany
1919 establishments in Germany